Regina Elena was the lead ship of her class of pre-dreadnought battleships built for the Italian Regia Marina (Royal Navy). The ship was built by the La Spezia shipyard between 1901 and 1907, and was armed with a main battery of two  guns and twelve  guns. Regina Elena was active in both the Italo-Turkish War with the Ottoman Empire in 1911–1912, where she participated in the Italian conquest of Cyrenaica, and World War I in 1915–1918, where she saw no action due to the threat of submarines in the narrow confines of the Adriatic Sea. She was retained for a few years after the war, but was ultimately stricken in February 1923 and broken up for scrap.

Design

The design for the Regina Elena class was prepared by the noted naval engineer, Vittorio Cuniberti, then the Chief Engineer of the Italian  (Royal Navy). The first two vessels—Regina Elena and —were ordered for the 1901 fiscal year, and the final pair— and —were authorized the following year.

Characteristics

She displaced  at full load. The ship had a slightly inverted bow and a long forecastle deck that extended past the main mast. Regina Elena had a crew of 742–764 officers and enlisted men.

Her propulsion system consisted of two vertical triple-expansion steam engines, each driving a screw propeller. Steam for the engines was provided by twenty-eight coal-fired Belleville boilers that were vented into three funnels.

As built, the ship was armed with a main battery of two  40-caliber guns placed in two single gun turrets, one forward and one aft. The ship was also equipped with a secondary battery of twelve  45-cal. guns in six twin turrets amidships. Close-range defense against torpedo boats was provided by a battery of sixteen  40-cal. guns in casemates and pivot mounts. Regina Elena was also equipped with two  torpedo tubes placed in the hull below the waterline.

Regina Elena was protected with Krupp steel manufactured in Terni.

Service history
Regina Elena was laid down at the  shipyard in La Spezia on 27 March 1901, and was launched on 19 June 1904. After fitting-out work was completed, she was commissioned into the Italian fleet on 11 September 1907. She thereafter served in the Mediterranean Squadron, and was ready for the annual maneuvers in late September and early October, under the command of Vice Admiral Alfonso di Brocchetti. In April 1908, Regina Elena participated in a naval demonstration off Asia Minor in protest of the Ottoman decision to prohibit Italian post offices in Ottoman territory. The ship was at that time commanded by Prince Luigi Amedeo, Duke of the Abruzzi. The ship went to Messina in the aftermath of the 1908 Messina earthquake. Regina Elena remained in the active duty squadron through 1910, by which time her three sisters had been completed, bringing the total number of front-line battleships to six, including the two s.

Italo-Turkish War

On 29 September 1911, Italy declared war on the Ottoman Empire in order to seize Libya. For the duration of the conflict, Regina Elena was assigned to the 1st Division of the 1st Squadron along with her three sisters, under the command of Vice Admiral Augusto Aubry. She joined the squadron late, on 5 October. On 18 October, Regina Elena and her three sisters, along with three cruisers and several destroyers and torpedo boats escorted a convoy that carried half of the 2nd Infantry Division to Benghazi. When the Ottomans refused to surrender the city before the amphibious assault, the Italian fleet opened fire on the Turkish defenders at 08:00, while landing parties from the ships and the Army infantry went ashore. The Italians quickly forced the Ottomans to withdraw into the city by evening. After a short siege, the Ottoman forces withdrew on 29 October, leaving the city to the Italians.

By December, Regina Elena and the other ships of the 1st Squadron were dispersed in the ports of Cyrenaica. Regina Elena, Roma, and the armored cruiser  were stationed in Benghazi, with Regina Elena recently arriving from Tobruk. While there, they supported the Italian Army as it occupied the city and surrounding area by contributing landing parties and providing fire support to the ground troops. The gunfire support supplied by Regina Elena contributed to the defeat of a major attack on the city by an Ottoman army on 14–15 December. In early 1912, most of the fleet had withdrawn to Italy for repairs and refit, leaving only a small force of cruisers and light craft to patrol the North African coast.

In March 1914, Regina Elena was involved in experiments with wireless telegraphy in Syracuse, Sicily. The tests were conducted by Guglielmo Marconi and were supervised by the Duke of the Abruzzi.

World War I

Italy declared neutrality after the outbreak of World War I in August 1914, but by July 1915, the Triple Entente had convinced the Italians to enter the war against the Central Powers. The primary naval opponent for the duration of the war was the Austro-Hungarian Navy; the Naval Chief of Staff, Admiral Paolo Thaon di Revel, believed the threat from submarines in the confined waters of the Adriatic was too serious to permit an active fleet policy. He therefore planned a distant blockade with the battle fleet, while smaller vessels, such as the MAS boats conducted raids. The heavy ships of the Italian fleet would be preserved for a potential major battle in the event that the Austro-Hungarian fleet should emerge from its bases.

As a result, the ship's career during the war was limited. During the war, Regina Elena and her three sisters were assigned to the 2nd Division. They spent much of the war rotating between the bases at Taranto, Brindisi, and Valona, but did not see combat. On 14–15 May 1917, three light cruisers of the Austro-Hungarian Navy raided the Otranto Barrage; in the ensuring Battle of the Strait of Otranto, Regina Elena and her sisters raised steam to assist the Allied warships, but the Italian commander refused to permit them to join the battle for fear of risking their loss in the submarine-infested Adriatic.

Under the terms of the Washington Naval Treaty, Italy was permitted to retain Regina Elena and her three sisters. The Italian Navy could have kept the ships in service indefinitely, but they could not be replaced by new battleships under the normal practice of the Treaty system. Nevertheless, she was stricken from the naval register on 16 February 1923 and subsequently broken up for scrap.

Footnotes

Notes

Citations

References

Further reading

External links
 Regina Elena (1904) Marina Militare website

Regina Elena-class battleships
World War I battleships of Italy
1904 ships
Ships built in La Spezia